Thomas Reginald White (3 July 1892 – 7 May 1979) was an English cricketer.  White was a right-handed batsman who bowled right-arm fast-medium.  He was born at Basingstoke, Hampshire.

White made a single first-class appearance for Sussex against Cambridge University in 1928.  In this match, he scored 9 runs in Sussex's first-innings, before being dismissed by Denis Blundell, while in their second-innings he was dismissed him for 4 by Maurice Allom.  Cambridge University won the match by 71 runs.

He died at Camden, London on 7 May 1979.

References

External links
Thomas White at ESPNcricinfo
Thomas White at CricketArchive

1892 births
1979 deaths
Cricketers from Basingstoke
English cricketers
Sussex cricketers